Andrew Brody (born May 3, 1995) is an American professional soccer player who currently plays for Real Salt Lake in Major League Soccer.

Career

College
Brody spent his entire college career at the University of Louisville.  He made a total of 61 appearances for the Cardinals and tallied 9 goals and 15 assists.

While at college, Brody appeared for Premier Development League side Orlando City U-23 in 2014 and 2015.

Professional
He signed with Salt Lake's United Soccer League side Real Monarchs on November 15, 2015 ahead of the 2016 season.

On July 12, 2019, Brody was loaned to Austrian third-tier side Pinzgau Saalfelden.

Brody returned to Monarchs in July 2020.

On September 25, 2020, it was announced that Brody would join Real Salt Lake's MLS roster as a homegrown player for the 2021 season.

Brody made his debut for Real Salt Lake during their 2021 home opener on May 1, 2021, coming on as a substitute in the 30th minute for the injured Aaron Herrera. He recorded an assist five minutes later, crossing the ball to Damir Kreilach.

Personal life
Andrew's father is former soccer player and coach Scott Brody. He was born in Florida where he attended Freedom High School

References

External links

1995 births
Living people
American soccer players
Louisville Cardinals men's soccer players
Orlando City U-23 players
Real Monarchs players
Real Salt Lake players
Association football midfielders
Soccer players from Orlando, Florida
USL League Two players
USL Championship players
American expatriate soccer players
Expatriate footballers in Austria
American expatriate sportspeople in Austria
Homegrown Players (MLS)
Major League Soccer players